Dimethyldioxirane (DMDO), also referred to as Murray's reagent in reference to Robert W. Murray, is a dioxirane derived from acetone and can be considered as a monomer of acetone peroxide. It is a powerful yet selective oxidizing agent which finds use in organic synthesis. It is known only in the form of a dilute solution, usually in acetone, and hence the properties of the pure material are largely unknown.

Synthesis
DMDO is not commercially available because of its instability. DMDO can be prepared as dilute solutions (~0.1 M) by treatment of acetone with potassium peroxymonosulfate , usually in the form of Oxone (2KHSO5·KHSO4·K2SO4).

The preparation of DMDO is rather inefficient (typical yields < 3%) and typically only yields a relatively dilute solution in acetone (only up to approximately 0.1 M).  This is tolerable as preparation uses inexpensive substances: acetone, sodium bicarbonate, and potassium peroxymonosulfate (commercially known as "oxone").  The solution can be stored at low temperatures and its concentration may be assayed immediately prior to its use.

The more active compound methyl(trifluoromethyl)dioxirane  can be similarly prepared from methyl trifluoromethyl ketone.

Stability
Solutions are stable under refrigeration (−10 to −20 °C) for up to a week. The rate of decomposition will increase upon exposure to light or heavy metals.

Uses
The most common use for DMDO is the oxidation of alkenes to epoxides.  One particular advantage of using DMDO is that the only byproduct of oxidation is acetone, a fairly innocuous and volatile compound. DMDO oxidations are particularly mild, sometimes allowing oxidations which might not otherwise be possible. In fact, DMDO is considered the reagent of choice for epoxidation, and in nearly all circumstances is as good as or better than peroxyacids such as meta-chloroperoxybenzoic acid (mCPBA).

Despite its high reactivity, DMDO displays good selectivity for olefins. Typically, electron deficient olefins are oxidized more slowly than electron rich ones.  DMDO will also oxidize several other functional groups.  For example, DMDO will oxidize primary amines to nitro compounds and sulfides to sulfoxides.  In some cases, DMDO will even oxidize unactivated C-H bonds:

DMDO can also be used to convert nitro compounds to carbonyl compounds (Nef reaction).

See also
 Shi epoxidation

References

Reagents for organic chemistry
Organic peroxides
Dioxiranes
Oxidizing agents